Nicholas Wood Brown (August 8, 1821 – November 21, 1889) was a manufacturer and political figure in Ontario. He represented Ontario South in the Legislative Assembly of Ontario from 1875 to 1879 as a Conservative member. His name also appears as Nicholas William Brown.

He was born in Whitby, the son of Abram Brown and Bathsheba Wood, both of Scottish descent and who came to Ontario from Vermont. After completing his schooling, Brown farmed until the age of 18, when he learned carpentry. He next opened a carriage shop and then manufactured agricultural implements and machinery for twenty years. In 1845, he married Susan Chapman. Brown served as reeve and mayor for Whitby. He was defeated when he ran for reelection to the assembly in 1879.

References

External links

1821 births
1889 deaths
Mayors of places in Ontario
Progressive Conservative Party of Ontario MPPs